Madame Sans-Gêne is a 1961 Spanish-Italian-French film co-production, filmed in Eastmancolor and Technirama, and distributed in the United States by Embassy Pictures. The film was directed by Christian-Jaque and adapted from the 1893 play by Victorien Sardou and Émile Moreau.

The film stars Sophia Loren and a cast of French and Italian players, including Robert Hossein, Julien Bertheau, Renaud Mary, Léa Gray, Gianrico Tedeschi, and Marina Berti.

Background 
Madame Sans-Gêne has a legendary history in France. It is based on the life of Catherine Hübscher, born in Goldbach-Altenbach (Haut-Rhin) in 1753. She started off as a laundress who used to wash and iron Napoleon's clothes when he was a common corporal. She married François Joseph Lefebvre, an army sergeant who became Marshal of France and was later elevated by Napoleon I to the rank of Duke of Danzig. She was known by the nickname of Madame Sans-Gêne, (literally Mrs No Embarrassment) because of her behaviour, free speech and lack of proper manners at court.

The play by Victorien Sardou and Émile Moreau were extremely popular. It was later serialised in novel form by Raymond Lepelletier.

The role was played on stage by Réjane, in France, England and New York and who also brought it to the screen twice, in 1900 and 1911. In 1924, silent screen star Gloria Swanson played the title role and it was an international box-office success. In 1941, it was played by Arletty. In 1945, it was made into an Argentinian film. The story was also the subject of the opera Madame Sans-Gêne by Umberto Giordano which had its world premiere at the Metropolitan Opera in 1915.

The 1961 film featured a FRF6 million budget, lavish period sets, and costumes designed for Loren by Marcel Escoffier and Itala Scandariato.

See also
 List of Technirama films

External links 
 
 
 

1961 films
1961 comedy-drama films
1961 romantic comedy films
1960s historical romance films
1960s Spanish-language films
French historical comedy-drama films
French historical romance films
Italian historical comedy-drama films
Italian historical romance films
Depictions of Napoleon on film
French Revolution films
French films based on plays
Italian films based on actual events
French films based on actual events
Films based on works by Victorien Sardou
Films produced by Ricardo Sanz
1960s Italian films
1960s French films